Mørsvikbotn Chapel is a chapel of the Church of Norway in Sørfold Municipality in Nordland county, Norway. It is located in the village of Mørsvikbotn. It is an annex chapel in the Sørfold parish which is part of the Salten prosti (deanery) in the Diocese of Sør-Hålogaland. The white, wooden chapel was built in a long church style in 1955. The chapel seats about 140 people.

See also
List of churches in Sør-Hålogaland

References

Sørfold
Churches in Nordland
Wooden churches in Norway
20th-century Church of Norway church buildings
Churches completed in 1955
1955 establishments in Norway
Long churches in Norway